The following is a list of countries in the Middle East sorted by projected population.

Table

See also 
Demographics of the Middle East
List of Arab countries by population

References

External links 
Middle East Countries By Population. WorldAtlas

Population
Middle East
Middle Eastern
Middle East
Africa
Eurasia